"Cold" is the third single of Static-X's second studio album, Machine. An alternative version of the song was  used on the Queen of the Damned soundtrack.

The song's video is a homage to Richard Matheson's classic 1954 horror novel I Am Legend.  The video was directed by Nathan "Karma" Cox and Linkin Park's Joe Hahn.

Track listing
 "Cold" - 3:40
 "Cold" (Mephisto Odyssey Remix) - 3:40
 "This Is Not" (Live) - 3:39
 "Cold" (Video)

Chart performance

References

2002 singles
2001 songs
Static-X songs
Warner Records singles
Songs written by Tony Campos
Songs written by Ken Jay
Songs written by Wayne Static